Sajib Das is a Bangladeshi composer, guitarist, and music director.

Biography 
Das learned music from Lucky Akhand. At the same time Das learned guitar from Balam. Das played with Akhand's band Happy Touch for 12 years. He began arranging music for Akhand in the 2000s.

Das released his first original song, "Bhalobashi Tomar Oi Roddur Hashi" on the Sangeeta label in 2007.

In 2014, he composed the music of a song for Indian singer Nachiketa. He wrote the music for the 2015 songs "Amar Bangladesh", sung by Imran, Liza, Jewel Morshed, Puja, Naomi, Jhelik, and Lemis, "Eka Eka Lage", sung by Fahmida Nabi, and "Man Tumi Choonye Gele", sung by SR Sumon and Nirjhar.

Among the albums Das has worked on are: RJ Raju's Suhasini, Shahjahan Sohag's Amar Prithibi Choto, and Ashik's Ekta Swopno. He has also composed songs for Samina Chowdhury, Rupankar Bagchi, Raghab Chatterjee, Lipi, Madhura, Shampa, and Abanti Sithi, among others.

Das's studio is in Mohammadpur, Dhaka.

Albums 

Some of his albums:

References

External links 
Sajib Das Official Website

Living people
21st-century Bangladeshi male singers
21st-century Bangladeshi singers
Year of birth missing (living people)